Frąca refers to the following villages in Poland

 Frąca, Gmina Osiek
 Frąca, Gmina Smętowo Graniczne